The twenty-third government of Israel was formed by Yitzhak Shamir of Likud on 22 December 1988, following the November 1988 elections. The government remained a national unity coalition between Likud and the Alignment, with the National Religious Party, Shas, Agudat Yisrael and Degel HaTorah also being members of the coalition. It was the first government to have a Minister of the Environment.

In 1990, after Shamir refused to accept a peace initiative developed by United States Secretary of State James Baker, the Alignment filed a motion of no-confidence in the government. Shamir fired all the Alignment ministers, but the vote was passed by 60-55, meaning that President Chaim Herzog had to ask one of the party leaders to form a new government. It was the first, and to date, only time which a government was brought down by a no confidence motion. Herzog initially asked Alignment leader Shimon Peres to form a new government, but after Peres was unable to, turned to Shamir, who successfully formed the twenty-fourth government on 11 June. The incident became known as the dirty trick.

Cabinet members

1 Although Deri was not a Knesset member at the time, he was a member of Shas.

References

External links
Tenth Knesset: Government 23 Knesset website

 23
1988 establishments in Israel
1990 disestablishments in Israel
Cabinets established in 1988
Cabinets disestablished in 1990
1988 in Israeli politics
1989 in Israeli politics
1990 in Israeli politics
 23
 23